Software Ecosystem is a book written by David G. Messerschmitt and Clemens Szyperski that explains the essence and effects of a "software ecosystem", defined as a set of businesses functioning as a unit and interacting with a shared market for software and services, together with relationships among them. These relationships are frequently underpinned by a common technological platform and operate through the exchange of information, resources, and artifacts.


The term in software analysis 

In the context of software analysis, the term software ecosystem is defined by Lungu  as “a collection of software projects, which are developed and co-evolve in the same environment”. The environment can be organizational (a company), social (an open-source community), or technical (the Ruby ecosystem). The ecosystem metaphor is used in order to denote an analysis which takes into account multiple software systems. The most frequent of such analyses is static analysis of the source code of the component systems of the ecosystem.

References

External links
 European workshop on software ecosystems
 International workshop on software ecosystems
 Workshop on Ecosystem Architectures

Business process
Software industry